Edgar Newton Eisenhower (January 19, 1889 – July 12, 1971) was an American lawyer and businessman, the older brother of President Dwight D. Eisenhower.

Early life and education 
Eisenhower was born in Hope, Kansas, the second oldest of seven Eisenhower brothers, six of them surviving infancy. Dwight D. Eisenhower, one year his junior, served in various roles in the United States Army before becoming president in 1953. Edgar's youngest brother, Milton S. Eisenhower became a university president. Earl D. Eisenhower, nine years his junior, served in the Illinois House of Representatives.

Eisenhower graduated from the University of Michigan with an LL.B. in 1914.

Career 
After earning his law degree, Eisenhower began practicing law in Tacoma, Washington. He was also the director of the St. Regis Paper Company, the Puget Sound National Bank (now KeyBank), and the Harmon FS Manufacturing Co.

Eisenhower was married three times, first to Louise Alexander Eisenhower (1893–1946), whom he married in 1911, then to Bernice Thompson Eisenhower (1902–1948) in 1930, and finally to his legal secretary Lucille Dawson Eisenhower (1921–2012) in 1951. Eisenhower had two children, both with his first wife, Merrill Jack Eisenhower (1916–1956), and Janis Louise Eisenhower Causin (1922–2000).

Eisenhower divorced his last wife, Lucille, in 1967, after sixteen years of marriage asserting that she caused "a burdensome home life".

Beginning in 1940, Eisenhower lived in a modest brick home on the west side of American Lake in Lakewood, Washington.

He died in Tacoma, Washington, on July 12, 1971, at the age of 82. Eisenhower is buried in Mountain View Cemetery in Lakewood.

References

Sources

External links
Papers of Edgar N. Eisenhower, Dwight D. Eisenhower Presidential Library 
Biography of Dwight D. Eisenhower

1889 births
1971 deaths
Eisenhower family
Dwight D. Eisenhower
People from Dickinson County, Kansas
People from Tacoma, Washington
Washington (state) lawyers
University of Michigan Law School alumni
Old Right (United States)